John Stoddart (1773–1856) was an English journalist and lawyer who served as editor of The Times.

John Stoddart may also refer to:

 John Stoddart (politician) (1842–1926), American politician
 John Stoddart (singer), American R&B/gospel singer-songwriter
 John Stoddart (stage designer) (1937–2001), Australian opera stage designer
 John Stoddart (tennis) (1962–2019), Australian tennis player

See also
 John Stoddard (disambiguation)